Western Suburbs District Cricket Club is a cricket club based in the Western Suburbs of Sydney, New South Wales, Australia. They are also known as the Western Suburbs and play in the Sydney Grade Cricket competition. They were founded in 1895 as Burwood. The Western Suburbs District Cricket Club (also known as The Magpies) have produced International Cricketers such as Michael Clarke, Mitchell Starc and Bob Simpson.

See also

References

External links
 

Sydney Grade Cricket clubs
Cricket clubs established in 1895
1895 establishments in Australia